Sir Francis Nugent Greer  (24 February 1869 – 6 February 1925) was a British barrister and civil servant.

Greer was the son of Judge Samuel McCurdy Greer, a former Member of Parliament for County Londonderry. He was educated at Trinity College, Dublin and was called to the Irish Bar in 1893.

In 1908, he joined the Irish Office as Parliamentary Draftsman, holding the position until 1923 when he was appointed Third Parliamentary Counsel to HM Treasury. He held this post until his sudden death two years later.

Greer was called to the English Bar in 1912 and appointed a King's Counsel for Ireland in 1918. He was appointed Companion of the Order of the Bath (CB) in 1913, knighted in the 1920 New Year Honours, and appointed Knight Commander of the Order of the Bath (KCB) in 1923.

Footnotes

References
Obituary, The Times, 7 February 1925

External links
 

1869 births
1925 deaths
Alumni of Trinity College Dublin
Irish barristers
English barristers
British King's Counsel
Civil servants in the Office of the Parliamentary Counsel (United Kingdom)
Civil servants in Ireland (1801–1922)
Knights Commander of the Order of the Bath
Knights Bachelor